Gregorio Fontana-Rava (fl. 1830s) was an Italian expatriate supporter of the Risorgimento.

Little is known of his life but he ran a bookshop in Antwerp as a meeting place for Italian patriots. His visit to England in 1833, during which he lectured, in association with Gioacchino Prati, caused some public alarm at his radical views.

Bibliography
Robson, A. P. & Robson, J. M. (eds) (1986) The Collected Works of John Stuart Mill, Volume XXIII - Newspaper Writings August 1831 - October 1834 Part II, Toronto: London: Routledge and Kegan Paul, "234. 'Fontana and Prati's St. Simonism in London', Examiner, 2 Feb., 1834, pp68-9"

Italian revolutionaries
Year of birth unknown
Year of death unknown